The 270s decade ran from January 1, 270, to December 31, 279.

Significant people
Aurelian (Aurelianus)
Claudius II Gothicus
Quintillus
Tacitus
Florianus
Probus

References